Acoustica is the first live album by Filipino rock band Wolfgang. The album was recorded on 30 September 2000 at the Music Museum in Greenhills, San Juan, Manila.

Track listing

Personnel
 Sebastian "Basti" Artadi (vocals)
 Manuel Legarda (6 & 12-string acoustic guitar)
 Ramon "Mon" Legaspi (bass)
 Leslie "Wolf" Gemora (drums)

Guest musicians
 David Aguirre (second acoustic guitar)
 Paul Zialcita (percussion)
 Martin Jamora (keyboards)

Guest vocalists
 Radha Cuadrado on "Matter of Time" and "Aquarius"
 UP Singing Ambassadors on "Center of the Sun" and "Aquarius"

References

External links
 Wolfgang website (archived)
 Wolfgang discography (archived)

Wolfgang (band) albums
2000 live albums